The 2022 Copa América Femenina Group A was the first of two sets in the group stage of the 2022 Copa América Femenina that took place from  to . The group competition consisted of Bolivia, Chile, hosts Colombia, Ecuador, and Paraguay. The top two teams automatically qualified for the top four knockout stage, while third place moved on to a fifth place match against the third place finisher of Group B. In the knockout stage and fifth place match, the top three qualified to the 2023 FIFA Women's World Cup, fourth and fifth place continued to the 2023 FIFA Women's World Cup repêchage, and sixth place was eliminated.

Teams

Standings

Matches

Bolivia vs Ecuador

Colombia vs Paraguay

Paraguay vs Chile

Bolivia vs Colombia

Paraguay vs Bolivia

Chile vs Ecuador

Chile vs Bolivia

Ecuador vs Colombia

Colombia vs Chile

Ecuador vs Paraguay

Discipline

Fair play points will be used as tiebreakers in the group if the overall and head-to-head records of teams were tied. These are calculated based on yellow and red cards received in all group matches as follows:

 first yellow card: plus 1 point;
 indirect red card (second yellow card): plus 3 points;
 direct red card: plus 4 points;
 yellow card and direct red card: plus 5 points;

References

Group A